Live at the Ventura Beach California is a concert of Eric Burdon with Robby Krieger and several other musicians.

In 1989, The Animals singer and The Doors guitarist had a conference together, called "The Rock 'n' Rolls Main Event". They started a tour. There were many bootlegs illegally released.

On 20 June 2008, they released a long-awaited concert on DVD.

Set list 
 "CC Rider"
 "Don't Bring Me Down"
 "Back Door Man"
 "Don't Let Me Be Misunderstood"
 "Roadhouse Blues"
 "Bring It On Home to Me"
 "No More Elmore"
 "The House of the Rising Sun"
 "Louie Louie"

2000s English-language films